In atmospheric optics, a photometeor is a bright object or other optical phenomenon appearing in the Earth's atmosphere when sunlight or moonlight creates a reflection, refraction, diffraction or interference under particular circumstances. The most common examples include halos, rainbows, fogbows, cloud iridescences (or irisation), glories, Bishop's rings, coronas, crepuscular rays, sun dogs, light pillars, mirages, scintillations, and green flashes.

Photometeors are not reported in routine weather observation.

See also

Hydrometeor
Rayleigh scattering

Notes and references

External links

South pole halos - an example of halos and arcs around the south polar sun

Atmospheric optical phenomena

sv:Meteor#Fotometeorer